Pachodynerus is a fairly large (about 50 species) neotropical and nearctic genus of potter wasps with higher diversity in central South America. At least one species (Pachodynerus nasidens) has been introduced in other biogeographical regions, including several oceanic islands, while Pachodynerus erynnis occurs on Ascension Island as well as in North America. This genus is most closely related to the genus Euodynerus.

References

 Willink, A. and A. Roig-Alsina. 1998. Revisión del género Pachodynerus Saussure (Hymenoptera: Vespidae, Eumeninae). Contrib. Am. Entomol. Inst. 30 (5): 1–117.

Biological pest control wasps
Potter wasps